"Loving the Alien" is a song written and recorded by David Bowie. It was the opening track to his sixteenth studio album Tonight. One of two tracks on the album written solely by Bowie, an edited version of the song was released as a single in May 1985, nine months after the release of lead single "Blue Jean" and eight months after the release of the album. "Loving the Alien" peaked at No. 19 in the UK Singles Chart. "Loving the Alien" inspired the title of Christopher Sandford's 1997 biography of Bowie and the 2018 Bowie box set release, Loving the Alien (1983–1988).

Background 
One of two tracks on the album written solely by Bowie, as a demo the song was simply called "1". The singer said the track "...came about because of my feeling that so much history is wrong – as is being rediscovered all the time – and that we base so much on the wrong knowledge that we've gleaned." He recorded a demo of the song in Montreux, Switzerland prior to recording the song for the album. Bowie later said that the production on the song undid the power of the lyric, saying he preferred the demo version, and in a separate interview lamented "You should hear 'Loving the Alien' on demo. It's wonderful on demo. I promise you! (laughs). But on the album, it's ... not as wonderful."

Promotion 

A music video was co-directed by Bowie with David Mallet. The original video included a short shot of Bowie with a nosebleed; this original version was only released on the 1987 video single "Day-In Day-Out", and all subsequent releases of the video have the nosebleed scene edited out. A single version of the song was released as a single in May 1985, nine months after the release of lead single "Blue Jean" and eight months after the release of the album.

Critical reception 
Bowie's biographer David Buckley called it "the only track on the album with the gravitas of much of his earlier work". Yo Zushi of the New Statesman described the song as a "seven-minute masterpiece". While critical of much of Bowie's 1980s output in his appraisal of Best of Bowie in 2002, BBC reviewer Chris Jones stated: "Loving the Alien does have a strange distant beauty to it. Like watching a ballet through a telescope."

Live performances 
Bowie performed "Loving the Alien" every night of his 1987 Glass Spider Tour, released on home video as Glass Spider in 1988. On the A Reality Tour in 2003 and 2004, he again performed the song, but this time as a stripped-down version with only Bowie on vocals and Gerry Leonard on guitar. Bowie said that the latter arrangement was "perhaps the way it should have always been done." A live performance from this tour, recorded in November 2003, was included on both a concert video (2004) and live album (2010).

Other releases 
The song "Loving the Alien" appears on several Bowie compilation albums, including Bowie: The Singles 1969–1993 (1993), some versions of Best of Bowie (2002), Sound + Vision (2003 and 2014 reissues), The Platinum Collection (2005), The Best of David Bowie 1980/1987 (2007), iSelect (2008), and Nothing Has Changed (3-CD version) (2014). The original album version, most of its remixes and b-sides all appear on the 2018 box set Loving the Alien (1983–1988).

The original uncensored video for "Loving the Alien" appears on the "Day-In Day-Out" video EP (1987), and the censored version appears on DVD releases of Bowie – The Video Collection (1993), Best of Bowie (2002) and The Best of David Bowie 1980/1987 (2007).

In 2002, Dutch-American producer the Scumfrog made a club mix of the song and released it as a single together with the original video of the song. The Scumfrog version of "Loving the Alien" reached #41 in the UK that year.

Steve Strange covered this song with his band Visage for the posthumous album Demons to Diamonds in 2015. It was remixed the next year on the album Darkness to Diamond.

Track listing

7": EMI America / EA 195 / EAP 195 (UK) 
 "Loving the Alien" (Re-mixed version)  – 4:43
 "Don't Look Down" (Re-mixed version)  – 4:04

12": EMI America SEAV-7860 / 12EA 195 / 12EAP 195 (UK) 
 "Loving the Alien" (Extended Dance Mix)  – 7:27
 "Don't Look Down" (Extended Dance Mix)  – 4:50
 "Loving the Alien" (Extended Dub Mix)  – 7:14
 Re-mixed by Steve Thompson and Michael Barbiero.

Download: EMI / iEA 195 (UK) 
 "Loving the Alien" (Re-mixed version)  – 4:43
 "Don't Look Down" (Re-mixed version)  – 4:04
 "Loving the Alien" (Extended Dance Mix)  – 7:27
 "Loving the Alien" (Extended Dub Mix)  – 7:14
 "Don't Look Down" (Extended Dance Mix)  – 4:50
 Released in 2007

Personnel 
 David Bowie – vocals
 Carlos Alomar – guitar
 Derek Bramble – bass guitar; synthesizer
 Omar Hakim – drums
 Carmine Rojas – bass guitar
 Guy St Onge – marimba
 Sam Figueroa – percussion
Production team
 David Bowie – producer
 Derek Bramble – producer
 Hugh Padgham – producer

Chart performance

Cover versions 
"Loving the Alien" has been covered by several other artists. These include:
 Iva Davies & Icehouse – The Berlin Tapes (1995), also included on Diamond Gods: Interpretations of Bowie (2001)
 Visage – Demons to Diamonds (2015)
 Peter Frampton Band – Frampton Forgets the Words (2021)

References 

 A Reality Tour, 2004
 Pegg, Nicholas, The Complete David Bowie, Reynolds & Hearn Ltd, 2000,

External links 
 "Life Beyond Mars" on Discogs

1984 songs
1985 singles
David Bowie songs
EMI America Records singles
Song recordings produced by David Bowie
Song recordings produced by Hugh Padgham
Songs critical of religion
Songs written by David Bowie
Music videos directed by David Bowie